Ferenc Wágner was a Hungarian sprint canoer who competed in the mid-1950s. He won two medals at the 1954 ICF Canoe Sprint World Championships in Mâcon with a silver in the K-1 4 x 500m and a bronze in the K-2 500 m events. He died in Newport, Wales in October 2010.

References

Hungarian male canoeists
Living people
Year of birth missing (living people)
ICF Canoe Sprint World Championships medalists in kayak
20th-century Hungarian people